Cape Fear may refer to:

Film and television
 Cape Fear (1962 film), a film by J. Lee Thompson starring Gregory Peck and Robert Mitchum
 Cape Fear (1991 film), a remake by Martin Scorsese starring Robert De Niro and Nick Nolte
 "Cape Feare", a 1993 episode of The Simpsons

Places
 Cape Fear (headland), a promontory of the coast of North Carolina
 Cape Fear (region), region of North Carolina surrounding Wilmington
 Cape Fear, Harnett County, North Carolina
 Cape Fear River

Schools
 Cape Fear Academy
 Cape Fear Community College
 Cape Fear High School

Other uses
 Cape Fear (album), a 2007 album by Canadian indie rock band Germans

See also
 Cap Fear (1901-1978), Canadian football player
 Cape Fear Crocs, a former minor league baseball team
 Cape Fear Indians, a tribe of Native Americans who lived on the Cape Fear River in North Carolina
 Cape Fear Museum